The 2019 FIBA Basketball World Cup qualification for the FIBA Americas region, began in November 2017 and concluded in February 2019. The process determined the seven teams that would participate at the 2019 FIBA Basketball World Cup.

Seeding
The top five teams at the 2016 Centrobasket and 2016 South American Basketball Championship, plus the three teams from North America (Canada, The USA, and Mexico) qualified directly to the 2019 FIBA World Cup qualification. Four additional teams were scheduled to be selected at a pre-qualifier tournament in July 2017, but it was canceled. Instead, the sixth and seventh placed teams at the Centrobasket and South American Championship were invited to the World Cup qualification.

 Notes

First round
All times are local.

Group A

Group B

Group C

Group D

Second round
In the second round, the top three teams from each group were placed in a group with three other top teams. All results from the first qualification round were carried over to the second round. Games were played in September 2018, November 2018 and February 2019. The top three teams in each group along with the better placed fourth team will qualified for the FIBA Basketball World Cup proper.

Group E

Group F

1 Virgin Islands did not arrive timely to play against Brazil and game was forfeited.

Best fourth placed team

Statistical leaders

Players

Points

Rebounds

Assists

Steals

Blocks

Other statistical leaders

References

External links
2019 Official website

qualification
FIBA
Basketball competitions in the Americas between national teams
2017–18 in South American basketball
2017–18 in North American basketball
2018–19 in South American basketball
2018–19 in North American basketball